Juan Mayr Maldonado (born 27 May 1952) is a Colombian photographer and environmentalist who served as Ambassador of Colombia to Germany from 2011 to 2016. From 1993 to 1996, Mayr was elected Vice President of the World Conservation Union. In 1998 he became Minister of Environment of Colombia. He has also been president of the United Nations' conference on Biosafety.

Goldman Prize
Mayr was awarded the Goldman Environmental Prize in 1993, for leading a struggle for protecting biodiversity in the Sierra Nevada de Santa Marta. He lived two years with the Kogi, and founded the Fundación Pro-Sierra Nevada de Santa Marta in 1986. In 1994 the Colombian government returned 19,500 hectares of traditional lands to the indigenous peoples of the Sierra Nevada.

Ambassadorship
On 30 August 2011, President Juan Manuel Santos Calderón appointed Mayr Ambassador of Colombia to Germany during a ceremony at the Palace of Nariño; Mayr presented his credentials to President Christian Wulff on 19 October 2011 at the Bellevue Palace.

References

Selected works
 

1952 births
Living people
Colombian people of Austrian descent
Colombian environmentalists
Colombian photographers
Colombian Ministers of Environment
Ambassadors of Colombia to Germany
Goldman Environmental Prize awardees